Heliothis metachrisea is a species of moth of the family Noctuidae. It is found on Madagascar.

metachrisea
Moths of Madagascar
Moths of Africa
Moths described in 1903